Walter C. Bachman (1911 – March 1, 1991) was an American ship designer and marine engineer, vice president and chief engineer at Gibbs and Cox, a member of the National Academy of Sciences, and a member of the American Society of Naval Engineers.

Bachman was noted for his work on the design of ship propulsion systems.

Bachman was born in Pittsburgh, Pennsylvania.
Bachman received a bachelor of science degree in industrial engineering and a master of science degree in mechanical engineering, both from Lehigh University, in 1933 and 1935, respectively.

References 

1911 births
1991 deaths
Engineers from Pennsylvania
Members of the United States National Academy of Engineering
People from Pittsburgh
Lehigh University alumni
Members of the United States National Academy of Sciences
20th-century American engineers